Hwanggumbol Station is a station on Hyŏksin Line of the Pyongyang Metro.

The station is next to a park and short distance from Sinso Bridge crossing the Potong River.

The station is the terminus of trolleybuses line 8, from Hwanggumbol station to the Arch of Triumph.

References

External links
 

Pyongyang Metro stations
Railway stations opened in 1978
1978 establishments in North Korea